Father's Son can refer to:

 Father's Son (1931 film), a 1931 film
 Father's Son (1941 film), a 1941 film
"Father's Son", a song by Celeste